Hengyang County is a county and the 5th most populous county-level division in the Province of Hunan, China; it is under the administration of Hengyang prefecture-level city. Located in the north of Hengyang City and the south east of Hunan province, the county is bordered to the north by Shuangfeng County, to the west by Shaodong County, to the south by the counties of Qidong and Hengdong and the districts of Zhengxiang, Shigu and Zhuhui, to the east by Nanyue District and Hengshan County. The county has 17 towns under its jurisdiction, the county seat is Xidu Town.

History
The county was the first time named after Hengyang in history that Hengyang County was formed through the amalgamation of the three counties of Linzheng, Xincheng and Chong'an in 589 AD (Sui dynasty). After that the county was once again divided into three counties of Linzheng, Xincheng and Chong'an, the two counties of Xincheng and Chong'an were merged to the county of Linzheng, the county of Linzheng was turned back to the name of Hengyang in 732 AD.

The provincial city of Hengyang was established from three townships and urban area of Hengyang County in January 1931. Hengnan County was formed from the 1st, 2nd, 4th and 9th districts in the south eastern portion of the county in April 1952, the county seat was transferred to Xidu Town in July 1952.

Geography
The county of Hengyang is located in the northwest of Hengyang City and the middle reaches of the Xiang River. It borders Nanyue District and Hengshan County to the east, and is adjacent to Zhengxiang District, Shigu District and Hengnan County in the south, Qidong County and Shaodong County in the west, and Shuangfeng County in the north. It is 74 kilometers from east to west and 55 kilometers from north to south.

The mountainous part of the county is the extension of the Hengshan range, rolling up and down. Its terrain is high in the northwest and low in the southeast, with hills and plains staggered. There are many plains on both sides of the rivers. The Zheng River runs through the county and merges to the river of Xiang at Shiguzui. It is convenient for water transportation with the Xiang River and Zheng River as the main channel. Mineral deposits in the county are placer gold, ceramic mud, coal, kaolin, limestone, barite, lead and zinc.

Terrain
Hengyang County is located in the transitional zone between the rise of Wuling Mountains and the subsidence of Dongting Lake, which is the northern edge of Hengyang Basin. The layers of tertiary red rock is deposited in the center of the basin and is about 3,000 meters thick. A series of tenia fornicis on the east, north and west sides are centered around the central-south red basin with different types of structures.

Climate
Hengyang has a subtropical monsoon climate with cool summers and warm winters, it is mainly warm and humid.

Subdivision

17 towns
 Chajiang
 Guanshi
 Hongshi
 Jibing
 Jiepai
 Jingtou
 Jinlan
 Jinxi
 Kuzongqiao
 Qulan
 Sanhu
 Shanqiao
 Shishi
 Taiyuan
 Xianshan
 Xidu
 Yanpi

8 townships 
 Banshi
 Chang'an
 Da'an
 Goulou
 Lanlong
 Xijiang
 Zhangmu
 Zhangshu

Economy
According to preliminary accounting of the statistical authority, the gross domestic product of Hengyang County in 2017 was 35,493 million yuan (5,257 million US dollars), up by 8.5 percent over the previous year. Of this total, the value added of the primary industry was 7,108 million yuan (1,053 million US dollars), up by 3.5 percent, that of the secondary industry was 12,656 million yuan (1,874 million US dollars), up by 7.4 percent and that of the tertiary industry was 15,729 million yuan  (2,330 million US dollars), up by 12.2 percent. The value added of the primary industry accounted for 20.03 percent of the GDP; that of the secondary industry accounted for 35.66 percent; and that of the tertiary industry accounted for 44.32 percent. The per capita GDP in 2017 was 33,115 yuan (4,905 US dollars).

Tourist resources

 Gouloufeng National Forest Park: a forest park at national level and one of AAA-rated tourist attractions in China with an area of  located in Goulou Township.
 Wanyuan Lake Scenic Area: one of national water scenic areas located between the towns of Jiepai and Shishi.
 Longwangxia Ecological Tourist Resort: a recreational resort with whitewater rafting, rock climbing, honorable person CS and outward development located in Longwang Village of Jinlan Town.
 Xiangxi Cottage: Xiangxi Cottage is the former residence of Wang Chuanshan, one of the provincial heritage conservation units of Hunan, a building of southern Hunan in the late Ming and early Qing dynasties located in Xiangxi Village of Qulan Town.
 Oriental Manor: a scenic spot of rural tourism with an area of 45.33 hectares, one of the national aquatic health farms by the Ministry of Agriculture, one of provincial agricultural tourism demonstration sites of Hunan and a Five - Star leisure manor in Hunan located in Yingpo Village of Xidu Town.
 Xia Minghan's Former residence: the Former Residence of Xia Minghan, an early leader of the Chinese revolution is a typical residence of southern Hunan in the Qing dynasty.
 Yishan Temple: the Yishan Temple, a famous temple in China with a history of over 1,700 years located in the north of Yishan Village in Shanqiao Town.
 Weaver Lake Water Scenic Area: or Zhinu Lake Water Scenic Area, one of national water scenic areas in China located Quanjing Village of Xinashan Town.
 Forest Ecological Park of Jiufen Mountain: a forestecological park located in Jiufeng Village of Xijiang Township.
 Danxia Landform Scenic Area of Shishi: a danxia landform scenic area located in Shishi Town, the south of Hengshan Mountains and north of Hengyang County.

References

 
County-level divisions of Hunan
Hengyang